Egypt's environmental problems include, but are not limited to, water scarcity, air pollution, damage to historic monuments, animal welfare issues and deficiencies in its waste management system.

Water resources

The Nile river has allowed for the summation of natural resources, affects Egyptians through the course of agricultural lands and irrigation systems. In addition to this, Egypt has an expanding population and limited resources. Although, countries like that of Western Europe, Japan and North America have higher demands on world resources. As a result, Egyptians have less land to farm, however, produce more crops per person than Thailand or the Philippines. The management of the Nile is important for economic growth in Egypt.

As a result, the effect has been that of an economic issue between various agents, both human and nonhuman agents. With the opening of natural resources and technological advancements through development projects in Egypt, it has historically created a range of feedback from Egyptians. Among these agricultural projects, the construction of villages were created to provide for the irrigation strategies following from that of Lower Egypt and Upper Egypt as a means of strengthening Egypt's economy at the height of its capitalist endeavors during the British occupation.

As the movement of economic growth through a market that had difficulty measuring import and export of capital through, not only foreign trade but within Egypt's borders. The Supreme Council of the Armed Forces have affected Egyptians during Egypt's revolutionary years. Starting from the Egyptian Revolution of 2011 environmental issues have increased by an array of actors taking a variety of direct actions in the public sphere.

There has been an intense social protest in Egypt and increased demand for access to resources such as agricultural land. Presently Egypt's uncertainty with Ethiopia's project is correlated with an economic interest in that agricultural land will be affected when rising natural resource shortages are at a high. Egypt depends on fruit cultivated land that is found across the Nile and has sustained Egypt's agriculture for more than 5,000 years. Egypt's fresh water is mainly derived from underground water. Underground water results in 95% of Egyptian's desert land. Egypt is also dependent on rainwater but it is a scarce and limiting source for agricultural development. In addition, Egypt refuses agricultural drainage water in correlation with Nile water for irrigation.

The importance of dams for Egyptians is exponential. The High Dam placed a halt on annual flooding of the Nile and allowed for extended sugarcane cultivation albeit the growing of wheat was displaced. The Nile floods provided brick making and house building labor. Mud became less available from the High Dam. The Nile allowed for 124 million tons of sediment to be carried to the sea each year and after the creation of the dam 98% of that sediment fell under the dam.

Environmentally, the Aswan Dam has contributed to numerous issues for Egyptians. The expansion of desert areas since the Aswan High Dam's construction in 1970 has increased in soil salinity which allowed for waterborne diseases to emerge. In 1994, 28% of Egypt's soils were damaged by significant levels of salinity. The importance of water resources for Egyptians has contributed to the creation of agencies, such as the Egyptian Ministry of State for Environmental Affairs, that promote and protect Egypt's natural resources.

The Nile Delta is currently under threat both from the rising sea levels (caused by climate change) and subsidence.
The subsidence also brings with it salinization which in turn jeopardizes the fertility of the soil. Without adequate measures, 15 percent of the arable land could be lost due to salinization.

Pollution

Air Pollution

The air pollution in Cairo is a matter of serious concern. The air pollution in downtown Cairo is more than 10 to 100 times of acceptable world standards. Cairo has a poor factor because of lack of rain and its layout of tall buildings and narrow streets, which create a bowl effect (bad ventilation and consequent trapping of pollutants). The main air pollution problem in Egypt is particulate matter. The most notable sources of the dust and small particles are transportation, industry, and open-air waste-burning. Another significant source of dust is wind blown from arid areas around Egypt (e.g. Western Desert).

The air in Egypt is very thick, grey and there is a haze over Cairo. Furthermore, other forms of air pollution in a carbon monoxide (CO) in streets, due to the excess amount of cars' exhaust and factories pollutants. The sky is grey rather than blue, which is very similar to the grey skies in Mexico City, London, and Beijing pollutants, of course, create a lot of respiratory diseases as the United States Environmental Protection Agency has published risk data which state that above the safe limit, the risk of developing serious respiratory diseases and cancer as well as cardiovascular disease from inhaling particulates in the air (dust and soot, hydrocarbons, and heavy metal compounds) is: 2 people for every 1000.

Noise pollution

From blaring car horns to wedding parties, rising noise pollution in the 24-hour metropolis of Cairo has reached alarming levels, leading to health problems. Living in the city centre, where noise levels reach an average of 90 decibels (dB) and never drop below 70 dB, is like spending all day inside a factory, a 2007 study by the Egyptian National Research Centre (NRC) said "What's striking about Cairo is that noise levels on different streets at different times of day are well over limits set by the environmental protection agency (EPA)". Noise pollution can contribute to many health problems.

Monuments

Pollution damage

Air and water pollution in Cairo have a destructive effect on the many monuments in the city. The Sultan Al-Ghuri Complex, for example, is one of many buildings in the center of the city which is covered in a gray and black crust from the air pollution. Al-Ghuri is representative of issues of decay of historic buildings in Cairo, both because it is an important medieval site including a funerary complex and mosque, and because the encrustation that appears on it has been studied in detail. Other sites examined in detail in the Greater Cairo area include the pyramids at Giza, Bab Zuweila, Al-Azhar Mosque, and the Cairo Citadel.

The black crust appears on the top parts of outside walls of monuments and other places of cultural and historical importance as a result of combustion of carbonaceous gases in an environment of rising humidity. In addition, white crusts and efflorescences appear on the lower sections of these walls. White crusts are formed by halite, or rock salt, depositions because of an increase in soil salinity. The rising, salt-loaded water table in the Nile Delta, where Cairo is located, deposits salts in foundation stones of monuments that rise up buildings through capillary action and are left behind as the water evaporates. The water table is rising throughout Egypt for a variety of reasons. These include sewage leakage and infiltration, factory or agricultural runoff, and inadequate groundwater pumping.

Buildings made of limestone like Al-Ghuri are susceptible to erosion by pollution because the crust that forms disrupts the integrity of the stone and falls off, removing the outer surface of the building with it. Many sites from the early Islamic era are falling into disrepair because of salt deposition from air and groundwater pollution as well as other destructive phenomena, and a major rescue effort is currently unfeasible because of the political and economic climate of Egypt. Salty and wet environments also lead to microbial growth. Without regular cleaning, historic buildings made of limestone, because of their high porosity, will continue to decay as a result of biological colonization.

Encroachment of water 
Sea levels are another environmental problem faced by those charged with protecting Egypt's archaeological sites. The city of Rosetta, nearby which the Rosetta Stone was found, for example, is on the Mediterranean coast and will be underwater in a matter of decades unless climate change is addressed on a global scale. Abu Mena, an Early Christian site designated as a UNESCO World Heritage Site in 1979, is one place in imminent danger of destruction. Efforts to reclaim land for agricultural use in the past few decades have waterlogged the usually dry and brittle clay that supports the buildings at Abu Mena.

According to UNESCO, "The destruction of numerous cisterns, disseminated around the city, has entailed the collapse of several overlying structures. Huge underground cavities have opened in the north-western region of the town. The risk of collapse is so high that the authorities were forced to fill with sand the bases of some of the most endangered buildings, including the crypt of Abu Mena with the tomb of the Saint, and close them to the public."

Egypt has faced similar issues in the past, with the damming of the Nile at Aswan. The creation of Lake Nasser to control the flow of the Nile through Lower Egypt and create hydroelectricity meant the flooding of sites like Abu Simbel. Abu Simbel is a monument to Ramses II built of sandstone, and comprises two temples to gods of the Ancient Egyptian pantheon. Emergency archaeological digs and projects were conducted to retrieve as much as possible from these sites that have been so well preserved by the arid climate. Abu Simbel itself was cut into pieces and moved to a cliff face above the new water level of the Nile above the dam. It now stands 60 meters above where it originally stood, on a cliff overlooking Lake Nasser.

Another well-known monument moved during the rescue mission was the temple complex at Philae, a Greco-Roman site that was originally a temple to the Ancient Egyptian goddess Isis, now located on the island of Agilkia. Some monuments were given to foreign museums for their aid in preserving sites flooded by Lake Nasser. Four such monuments were the Temple of Debod, now in the Parque del Oeste in Madrid, Spain, the Temple of Ellesyia which is now in Italy, the Temple of Taffeh now housed in the Rijksmuseum van Oudheden in Leiden, the Netherlands, and the Temple of Dendur which is on display at the Metropolitan Museum of Art in New York.

One of the largest environmental pressures on Abu Simbel is tourism and its associated issues. Landscaping conducted in order to make the site seem more presentable in its new clifftop home has damaged the delicate sandstone rock face. Landscapers brought in sand, which blew in the wind and almost eroded a face of Nefertari on the temple, one of the wives of Ramses II. In an attempt to solve this problem, grass was planted around the base of the temples. Watering the grass also damaged the site by raising the humidity levels in the sandstone. People are often careless at archaeological sites, brushing up against ancient wall paintings and climbing onto parts of monuments to capture photographs.

Tourists have caused damage to other sites in Egypt, such as the Great Pyramid of Cheops. Much like the limestone monuments inside the city of Cairo proper, the limestone pyramids at Giza are susceptible to changes in humidity and salinity. The breath of tourists inside the chambers creates salt encrustations that crack the interior walls of the pyramids. The pyramids are constantly undergoing repairs to clean salt from the walls in an attempt to prevent further damage. Ventilation systems have been installed inside the Great Pyramid and in other structures on the Giza Plateau in order to lessen the impact of tourists' breath.

Another problem that tourism brings is graffiti. Graffiti has been left in the chambers of the pyramids since they were being built over 4,000 years ago when workers building the pyramids left their mark on the walls. However, more recent graffiti at the Giza necropolis has damaged sites. Monuments often must be closed and renovated to remove marks made by modern visitors. In 2013, a Chinese tourist carved his name into a wall of the Luxor Temple, in the south of Egypt, causing widespread outrage and igniting an international discussion about tourists and graffiti in general.

Development

Tourism as well as urban sprawl have contributed to the degradation of sites, especially in the Greater Cairo area. The Ring Road, provided for in the Master Plan for Greater Cairo passed in 1984, has been the biggest developmental threat to the monuments on the Giza Plateau in the last quarter century. The road was intended to relieve traffic pressure on the city of Cairo. It was discovered to be cutting through several protected areas on the plateau, which is the site of the pyramids, the Sphinx, and other lesser-known monuments.

In protest of the planned southern route of the Ring Road, which would encompass the necropolis, UNESCO removed the pyramids from the World Heritage list to pressure the Egyptian government into changing the plans for the road. The shame and loss of funding resulting from this sanction forced the government to rethink the route of the highway, and the pyramids have since regained their standing as a World Heritage Site.

The city of Cairo has been encroaching on the Giza plateau for decades. The population has exploded so much that there are now apartments only a few hundred yards away from the pyramids. Suburban development, golf courses, and fast food chains now come much closer to the Sphinx and the pyramids than is legal according to UNESCO spokesman Said Zulficar. "You can't chop up this site just as if it's salami," said Said, "It will lose its uniqueness... It's in total violation of the world heritage convention [Egypt] signed, and it's in violation of Egyptian law."

Urbanization

Egypt is the most populated country in the Middle East and North Africa region (MENA) with over 104 million inhabitants. Since the majority of Egypt's geography consists of expansive desert, 43.1% of citizens live in urban areas along the Nile or Mediterranean Sea, such as Cairo, Alexandria, or Aswan.

Cairo is not only the largest city in the Arab World, with a population 12.3 million, but is also one of the densest. The governate of Cairo was reported to have an urban population density of 45,000 per square kilometer (117,000 per sq mi) in 2012 (CAPMAS). This is 1.5 times the density of Manhattan. A report from United Arab Emirates University states, "This pattern of urban growth has two contradictory facets. On the one hand, mega-cities act as engines of economic and social growth, but on the other hand, most of this is also being accompanied by the urbanization of both poverty and environmental degradation." Much of government policy has focused on population density as the main contributor to a multitude of social, economic, and environmental challenges such as noise and air pollution, heavy traffic, limited housing capacity, and poor public health.

Cairo's government officials have been making efforts to decentralize living and working arrangements since 1970 as a way to improve quality of life. Rather than focusing on improving infrastructure within the city, many of the proposed solutions involve moving residents into recently constructed metropolitan areas in the desert. This tactic has introduced many of its own issues such as interference with agricultural practices and increasingly limited water access. Former President Mubarak emphasized the necessity of desert expansion in a speech to parliament in 2006, stating, "Leaving the narrow (Nile) valley and fanning out, in a planned and organized manner, throughout the country, has become an unavoidable necessity. In view of these facts, the conquest of the desert is no longer a slogan or dream but a necessity dictated by the spiraling population growth. What is required is not a token exodus into the desert but a complete reconsideration of the distribution of population throughout the country."

City planners have proposed the construction of megacities, built from the ground up, to diffuse populations out of Cairo. New Cairo and 6th of October City are brand new subdivisions built to hold millions by 2020 and hold major headquarters currently housed in Cairo. These planned cities are still under construction but are already home to large industrial areas and several universities. Most recently, the Egyptian government has proposed the construction of an entirely new capital city. However, reports show that these tactics have had limited success and a different approach is necessary in order to alleviate the impact of many urban problems.

Traffic

The greater metropolitan area of Cairo is notorious for its extreme levels of traffic congestion. The World Bank reports at least 1,000 deaths annually as a result of traffic related accidents, half of which are pedestrians. While an additional 4,000 Cairenes are injured from car accidents. Other urban areas, such as New York City, report less than 300 fatalities yearly from motor vehicle accidents. The traffic has grown to be damaging not only to public safety, but also economic growth. With an average traffic speed less than 10 kilometers per hour and an average commute time at 37 minutes, the congestion has grown to limit the city's productivity and efficiency. This has had significant economic effects, costing the country $8 billion annually, equivalent to almost 4% of Egypt's gross domestic product (GDP), resulting from lost work hours, wasted fuel, and the environmental impacts of those additional emissions.

The high number of cars on the road is the result of many factors such as government subsidies on fuel, limited public transportation options, and enhanced credit opportunities from banks. In 2012, The Central Agency for Public Mobilization and Statistics (CAPMAS) reported 2.07 million licensed vehicles in Cairo.
Attempts to reduce traffic congestion have increased in the last several years. Many government workers and urban planning experts believe in developing more efficient public transportation systems as a means to mitigate the effects of private cars. The Cairo Metro currently only runs three lines for the city's 7 million people. Christian Bauriedel, a professor at the American University in Cairo claims that the addition of 10 to 15 new metro lines and 200 new bus lanes has the potential to reduce traffic by 40%. A fourth line is scheduled to be built by 2019, however work has yet to begin. Another proposed solution has been the creation of pedestrian tunnels underneath the city to ensure citizen's safety while crossing roads.

A New Capital City 

On March 13, 2015, Housing Minister Mostafa Madbouly announced Egypt's plans for a $45 billion project constructing a new capital city just east of Cairo. The new city, which is currently unnamed, is estimated to take only five to seven years to complete and house up to seven million people. Madbouly reported the goal of the project to be a major reduction in the congestion and population of Cairo, which is expected to double over the next 40 years. The city's brand new website describes the development as "a momentous endeavour to build national spirit, foster consensus, provide for long-term sustainable growth and address various issues faced by Egypt through a new city, which will create more places to live, work and visit".

The plans have received skepticism for being fairly ambitious, boasting new administrative and government buildings, an international airport, a technology and innovation park, solar energy farms, eighteen hospitals, and thousands of schools and universities. The situation was complicated further when President Abdel Fatah al-Sisi cancelled the project a month after its unveiling due to a lack of government funds. However, Madbouly stated that the project will continue with funding from the private sector.

Green Spaces
As a Valentine's Day of Cairo's ever-growing urbanization, the components that enhance the city's livability have diminished. Incredible levels of traffic combined with severe air and sound pollution place a major hindrance on Cairenes' quality of living. The lack of urban green space is yet another one of these factors. Cairo currently only has about 1.65 square meters of green space per capita. This is low considering the World Health Organization (WHO) suggests a minimum of nine square meters per person, with the optimal amount being between ten and fifteen square meters. The presence of these spaces has been reported to reduce air pollution while incentivizing physical exercise, fresh food production and improved mental health.

Cairo's minimal green space is surprising when considering the city's history of parks and landscaping. The capital was founded around a bustan, a modern-day park, and has since been filled with many different kinds of open spaces, such as basatin and mayadin. However, these open spaces with parks and gardens offered ideal locations for development and have since been considered attractive targets for profitable real estate.

Today, Cairo's low quantity of parks has only been worsened by rapid increases in development and a lack of urban planning. Where green spaces do exist, they are poorly distributed and inadequately maintained. While some residents are hopeful that the establishment and development of satellite cities will improve conditions in Cairo, others are not as optimistic and foresee further neglect of green spaces in the future.

Legislative power over land and water

Egyptian Ministry of State for Environmental Affairs
The Egyptian Environmental Affairs Agency is the highest authority in Egypt for promoting and protecting the environment. It is also secondary to bigger ministries in Egypt like that of Petroleum, Industry or Finance. In 1997, Egypt's first full-time Minister of State for Environmental Affairs was assigned to deal with environmental policies for sustainable development.

The Ministry of State for Environmental Affairs (MSEA) and its executive arm, the Egyptian Environmental Affairs Agency (EEAA) considers the management of natural resources to all of Egypt's national policies and projects. The main objective is to preserve natural resources, biological diversity and national heritage in relation to sustainable development. Environmental Protection Agency scientists signed an agreement with counterparts in Egypt to protect human consumption from microbiological contamination in drinking water.

Rural inequality is an issue in Egypt's agricultural development. Central government policies and wealth have been a core political issue concerning the relationship between rural population and state. International development, similar to the Grand Renaissance dam, is debated over proper management of resources. Timothy Mitchell, a political scientist of the Arab world, suggests that a solution may be to "decentralize the state and allow for some of the powers in Egypt's market to be reconfigured". In this way, Egypt can counteract agricultural differences based on management of the Nile which is a shared agricultural source for most of the 9 countries dependent on its natural resources.

The Grand Renaissance Dam issue
 

Egyptian nationalists have denounced Ethiopia's new project, The Grand Ethiopian Renaissance Dam. The Great Renaissance Dam will be Africa's largest hydroelectric facility. The construction of the dam will affect Sudan and Egypt's political relations with Ethiopia. In 1959 Egypt and Sudan made an agreement that allowed Egypt to have 70% of the Nile's water flow while Sudan had 30 percent. In 2013 protestors gathered in front of Ethiopian embassy in Cairo, as then Morsi administration allowed for the project to proceed. Egyptian administrations have attempted military solutions to halt the project, but the Egyptian government at the time did not pursue.

The Italian Salini (Salini Impregilo) Company is building the Renaissance Dam  after signing a contract with the Ethiopian government in December 2010 worth $4.65 billion to be completed in six years. Egypt's Minister of Water Resources and Irrigation visited Italy to explain the country's water security. Egypt is continuing international influence to protect their share of the Nile waters, as well as contacting international donors, the World Bank and the African Development Bank to not give technical support for the construction of the dam in order to halt any damage to Egypt. Ethiopian Prime Minister Hailemariam Desalegn declared that Ethiopia would not back down from building the Renaissance dam. There was no clear agreement made by water ministers of Egypt, Sudan and Ethiopia. Egypt planned to send foreign experts to follow on how to implement experts' reports on behalf of building the dam first. Egypt's influence to propose a halt on the Dam is at difficult transition.

On April 13, 2014, Ethiopia's National Panel of Experts faced controversy with the International Rivers Network. The IRN, an anti-dam organization founded in 1985, criticized the Renaissance Dam's construction. The U.S. based environmental organization was accused of "being paid by Egypt in order to lobby against the Renaissance Dam". The main issue results in the debate about whether Egypt will be harmed, in terms of its water resources and population and the IRN is seeking to prevent international aid to Ethiopia's project. The creation of Grand Renaissance Dam would not affect Egypt's share of Nile as it is not constructed for irrigation but rather hydroelectricity. Water may be lost from evaporation but Egypt and Sudan will benefit from the dam due to the trapped sediments that would otherwise flow downstream prolonging lives of major reservoirs in both countries. Egypt has attempted to gain support in order to halt construction of the dam. As of April 25, 2014 Ethiopia has completed 32% of the Grand Renaissance Dam.

Overview of Sudan and Egypt water relations

The 1929 Agreement between Egypt and Sudan allowed Egypt to have more control over the entire flow of the river. However, when Sudan gained independence in 1956 there was demand for revision of the treatment. An agreement in 1959 allowed for 55.5 billion cubic meters of water to go to Egypt and 18.5 billion cubic meets to Sudan. Sudan has fertile land where expanded irrigation could be profitable. Sudan had tried to increase water supplies by draining the Sudd wetlands of the south. Sudan had faced a failed project, Jonglei Canal in 1984.

Tension with Saudi Arabia
Egypt has sought Saudi aid on halting the construction of the Renaissance Dam. Currently, Saudi Arabia invests in economic development projects based in Ethiopia.
Saudi Arabia and the United Arab Emirates have offered financial aid packages, approximately $10.7 billion, to the Egyptian government after the fall of the Muslim Brotherhood. 
 The significance of Egypt and Saudi Arabi's relationship could either be beneficial for Egypt's goals in stopping the construction of the dam or prove otherwise.

Egypt's hydropolitics

Egypt is part of the Nile Basin alongside Sudan, Ethiopia, Uganda, Kenya, Tanzania, Burundi, Rwanda and the Democratic Republic of Congo. The allocation of power over the use of the Nile has been a source of conflict for years. The Nile is a symbol of Egypt's nationalism which has led to strong opposition from neighboring countries. The Nile River provides irrigation, hydroelectricity and industrialization for Egypt. Egypt claims to support and stress the importance of water and agricultural projects in order to preserve its environment and allow for the Nile to develop an abundance of resources. Egypt has once threatened to go to war over water conflict against Ethiopia and Tanzania in the past.

Regarding Egypt's current water conflicts, one current and controversial water issue is Egypt's current stance against the construction of the Grand Ethiopian Renaissance Dam. The Dam proposed by Ethiopia is an engineered gravity dam on the Blue Nile that will be one of the biggest water projects near the region. The issue then for Egypt, among other countries in the Nile Basin, is whether this project will decrease water flow in the Nile. The Nile Basin Initiative, Egypt's civil society, and foreign relations are a few of the main contributors to the historical and social framework Egypt's hydro-politics and environmental concerns.

Egypt's hydro political framework
Nile Basin Initiative

An initiative that mediates the Nile Basin for all countries that share the river in order to share socioeconomic benefits of the Nile and the promotion of regional peace and security.

Environment's Civil Society

Egyptians are active on land rights and land reforms. The 1997 repeal of Nasser-era land reforms policies and the Land Center for Human Rights were some of the changes of Egypt's environmental political activism. In Sinai, Egypt the lack of land reforms to stabilize the security crisis in Sinai by Mohamed Morsi, Hosni Mubarak and Abdel Fattah el-Sisi.

Environmental foreign relations in Egypt

Egypt has had a significant role to play in mediating conflicts of Arab States and East African states. Egypt was a mediator in resolving disputes between Arab states. Sudan and Egypt relations are weak; presently is a territorial dispute with Sudan over the Halaib Triangle. However, both countries are in agreement with the issue of water access and water rights on behalf of the Grand Ethiopian Renaissance Dam.

Egypt's water resource projects in the Upper Nile
When looking at Egypt's participation in water projects that promote economic and agricultural growth in the region and beyond, it is necessary to see the impact that Egypt has had in its own country and its participation with foreign relations. These are some projects in which Egypt has tried to utilize the Nile and nearby rivers.

The Charter of Integration between Egypt and Sudan:

The Jonglei Canal project in Bahr al-Jabal and Bahr az-Zaraf Area was constructed to prevent waste of water, approximately 15 billion cubic meters, due to evaporation in swamp areas.
The Mashar Swamps project was created to collect lost water from Mashar swamps and Sobat River.
The Northern Bahr al-Ghazal project was constructed to combat the loss of intensive evaporation. The project was constructed by digging a canal in order to collect and channel water from the northern part of Bahr al-Ghazal with the White Nile.
The Southern Bahr al-Ghazal project was constructed so that the river waters from Bahr al-Ghazal would flow east towards Bahr al-Jabal.

Additional Egyptian projects

Along with the projects made between Sudan and Egypt; Egypt has considered storage projects in equatorial lakes: Lake Victoria, Lake Kyoga, Lake Albert. Egypt is in participation with Ethiopia and Uganda in some projects and establishing power generation stations. Egypt financed several contributions made to water conservation: the assessment of available water resources, climate change, drought, Basin's water quality, and water planning. Egypt has constructed over the course of its history several other projects, namely: Mahmoudiyah canal, Suez Canal, Aswan Dam, Toshka (otherwise known as the New Valley Project). The Aswan Dam was constructed as Egypt's main source of yielding electric power.

The New Valley Project was designed as a second Nile Valley located in the south of Egypt's Western Desert. The East Owainat Project is another development project in the southern valley of Egypt which is irrigated by a nearby groundwater reservoir. The purpose of the East Owainat Project is to export organic crops for the trade of which these are: medicinal herbs, fruits, and various grains. The As-Salam Canal project is another development project that has a great impact on surrounding cultivated area with that of the Nile water and agricultural drainage water. The project Al-Ein Es-Sokhna New Port is located near the Suez Gulf and is a 4  km canal that connects the passage route of the Suez Canal to the Al-Ein Es-Sokhna New Port that has 4 basins that accommodate ships. These projects have contributed to water engineering, conservation, and distribution in Egypt and surrounding areas.

See also 
 Animal welfare in Egypt
 Climate change in the Middle East and North Africa
 Economy of Egypt and the environment
 Hydrogen economy
 Leapfrogging from natural gas to hydrogen
 Methane pyrolysis
 Waste Management in Egypt

References

External links

Pollution Egypt
Water Pollution in Egypt Reached Complex Stage. Egypt News.

Living with Pollution in Egypt A document about pollution in Egypt published in the American University in Cairo by Nicholas S. Hopkins and Sohair R. Mehanna. On SpringerLink
The Nile Basin Initiative
Egyptian Ministry of State for Environmental Affairs
Salini Impregilo
International River Foundation
 On Toshka New Valley's mega-failure

 
Egypt